Belarus participated in the Eurovision Song Contest 2008 with the song "Hasta la vista" written by Eleonora Melnik and Taras Demchuk. The song was performed by Ruslan Alekhno. The Belarusian entry for the 2008 contest in Belgrade, Serbia was selected through the national final Eurofest 2008, organised by the Belarusian broadcaster National State Television and Radio Company of the Republic of Belarus (BTRC). The national final was a televised production which consisted of a semi-final and a final held on 21 December 2007 and 21 January 2008, respectively. Fifteen competing acts participated in the semi-final where four entries qualified to the final: one entry selected by a public televote and three entries selected by a nine-member jury panel. In the final, the jury panel selected "Hasta la vista" performed by Ruslan Alekhno as the winner.

Belarus was drawn to compete in the second semi-final of the Eurovision Song Contest which took place on 22 May 2008. Performing during the show in position 9, "Hasta la vista" was not announced among the 10 qualifying entries of the first semi-final and therefore did not qualify to compete in the final. It was later revealed that Belarus placed seventeenth out of the 19 participating countries in the semi-final with 27 points.

Background 

Prior to the 2008 Contest, Belarus had participated in the Eurovision Song Contest four times since its first entry in 2004. The nation's best placing in the contest was sixth, which it achieved in 2007 with the song "Work Your Magic" performed by Dmitry Koldun.

The Belarusian national broadcaster, National State Television and Radio Company of the Republic of Belarus (BTRC), broadcasts the event within Belarus and organises the selection process for the nation's entry. Since 2004, BTRC has organised a national final in order to choose Belarus' entry, a selection procedure that continued for their 2008 entry.

Before Eurovision

Eurofest 2008 
Eurofest 2008 was the national final format developed by BTRC to select the Belarusian entry for the Eurovision Song Contest 2008. The competition consisted of a semi-final and final held on 21 December 2007 and 21 January 2008, respectively. Both shows were hosted by Denis Kurian and Vera Poliakova and broadcast on the First Channel and Belarus TV as well as online via the broadcaster's official website tvr.by.

Competing entries 
Artists and composers were able to submit their applications and entries to the broadcaster between 15 November 2007 and 20 November 2007. At the closing of the deadline, over 70 entries were received by the broadcaster. Auditions were held between 5 and 7 December 2007 at the Youth Variety Theater in Minsk where a jury panel was tasked with selecting up to fifteen entries to proceed to the televised national final. The jury consisted of Mihail Finberg (chairman of the jury, director of the Belarusian State Academic Symphony Orchestra), Vladimir Rylatko (deputy head of the Belarusian Ministry of Culture), Vasily Rainchik (musician/composer), Anatoly Yarmolenko (director of the ensemble Syabry), Yadviga Poplavskaya (singer), Denis Shpitalnikov (head of music and entertainment programmes of BTRC), Alexandr Kapenkin (deputy director of BTRC), Irina Dorofeeva (singer) and Leonid Shirin (composer). Fifteen semi-finalists were selected and announced on 11 December 2007.

Semi-final

The televised semi-final took place on 21 December 2007 at the BTRC studios in Minsk. Prior to the semi-final, a draw for the running order took place on 20 December 2007. Four songs qualified to the final. The fifteen competing entries first faced a public televote where one song advanced. An additional three qualifiers were selected from the remaining fourteen entries by the votes of jury members made up of music professionals.

Final
The televised final took place on 21 January 2008 at the Sports Palace in Minsk. The votes of jury members made up of music professionals selected the song "Hasta la vista" performed by Ruslan Alekhno as the winner.

In addition to the performances from the competitors, the show featured guest performances by former Eurovision Song Contest winners Sertab Erener (2003), Ruslana (2004) and Lordi (2006), 2005 Russian Eurovision contestant Natalia Podolskaya and Belarusian Junior Eurovision Song Contest 2007 winner Alexey Zhigalkovich.

Promotion 
Ruslan Alekhno made several appearances across Europe to specifically promote "Hasta la vista" as the Belarusian Eurovision entry. Between 27 February and 9 March, Ruslan Alekhno performed "Hasta la vista" during the Georgian, Greek, Lithuanian, Macedonian and Russian Eurovision national finals. On 25 April, Alekhno performed during the UKEurovision Preview Party event which was held at the Scala Club in London, United Kingdom.

At Eurovision

According to Eurovision rules, all nations with the exceptions of the host country and the "Big Four" (France, Germany, Spain and the United Kingdom) are required to qualify from one of two semi-finals in order to compete for the final; the top nine countries from the televoting progress to the final, and a tenth qualifier was determined by the back-up juries. The European Broadcasting Union (EBU) split up the competing countries into six different pots based on voting patterns from previous contests, with countries with favourable voting histories put into the same pot. On 28 January 2008, a special allocation draw was held which placed each country into one of the two semi-finals. Belarus was placed into the second semi-final, to be held on 22 May 2008. The running order for the semi-finals was decided through another draw on 17 March 2008 and Belarus was set to perform in position 9, following the entry from Czech Republic and before the entry from Latvia.

The two semi-finals and the final were broadcast in Belarus on the First Channel with commentary by Denis Kurian and Alexander Tikhanovich. The Belarusian spokesperson, who announced the Belarusian votes during the final, was Olga Barabanschikova.

Semi-final 

Ruslan Alekhno took part in technical rehearsals on 13 and 17 May, followed by dress rehearsals on 21 and 22 May. The Belarusian performance featured Ruslan Alekhno performing on stage wearing a black outfit together with four female dancers wearing short silver dresses. The performers performed a choreographed routine around five light-up baubles that moved around on the stage floor during the performance, which was concluded by the dancers displaying the letter R.

At the end of the show, Belarus was not announced among the 10 qualifying entries in the second semi-final and therefore failed to qualify to compete in the final. It was later revealed that Belarus placed seventeenth in the semi-final, receiving a total of 27 points.

Voting 
Below is a breakdown of points awarded to Belarus and awarded by Belarus in the second semi-final and grand final of the contest. The nation awarded its 12 points to Ukraine in the semi-final and to Russia in the final of the contest.

Points awarded to Belarus

Points awarded by Belarus

References

2008
Countries in the Eurovision Song Contest 2008
Eurovision